The median thyrohyoid ligament (also middle hyothyroid ligament or middle thyrohyoid ligament) is the thicker, middle part of the thyrohyoid membrane. Its lateral thinner portions are pierced by the superior laryngeal vessels and the internal branch of the superior laryngeal nerve. Its anterior surface is in relation with the thyrohyoideus, sternohyoideus, and omohyoideus muscles, and with the body of the hyoid bone.

References

External links
  - "Larynx, anterior view"
  - "Larynx, lateral view"

Ligaments of the head and neck